The 2002–03 season was the 57th season in Rijeka's history. It was their 12th season in the Prva HNL and 29th successive top tier season.

Competitions

Prva HNL

First stage

Second stage (relegation play-off)

Results summary

Results by round

Matches

Prva HNL

Source: HRnogomet.com

Croatian Cup

Source: HRnogomet.com

Intertoto Cup

Source: HRnogomet.com

Squad statistics
Competitive matches only.  Appearances in brackets indicate numbers of times the player came on as a substitute.

See also
2002–03 Prva HNL
2002–03 Croatian Cup
2002 UEFA Intertoto Cup

References

External links
 2002–03 Prva HNL at HRnogomet.com
 2002–03 Croatian Cup at HRnogomet.com 
 Prvenstvo 2002.-2003. at nk-rijeka.hr

HNK Rijeka seasons
Rijeka